Mejillones is a Chilean port city and commune in Antofagasta Province in the Antofagasta Region.

Mejillones (Spanish plural for mussel), can refer to:

 Puerto de Mejillones Province, a province in the western parts of the Bolivian department of Oruro
 Mejillones Peninsula protrudes from the coast of northern Chile north of Antofagasta and south of the port of Mejillones
 Municipal Mejillones, a Chilean football club